Daviesia rubiginosa is a species of flowering plant in the family Fabaceae and is endemic to inland areas of south-western Western Australia. It is a broom-like, glabrous to glaucous shrub with scattered, linear to cylindrical phyllodes, and orange-yellow and red flowers.

Description

Taxonomy
Daviesia rubiginosa was first formally described in 1995 by Michael Crisp in Australian Systematic Botany from specimens collected east of Peak Charles in 1979. The specific epithet (rubiginosa) means "rust-coloured".

Distribution and habitat
This daviesia grows in heath on the eastern edge of the wheatbelt in the Avon Wheatbelt, Coolgardie and Mallee biogeographic regions of south-western Western Australia.

Conservation status 
Daviesia rubiginosa is listed as "not threatened" by the Government of Western Australia Department of Biodiversity, Conservation and Attractions.

References 

rubiginosa
Taxa named by Michael Crisp
Plants described in 1995
Flora of Western Australia